Kovanluk is a suburban community in the municipality of Kraljevo, Serbia. It is located 3.5 kilometers from the city center and has about 5,000 inhabitants, most of whom settled there after leaving neighboring communities.

Populated places in Raška District